Mønsted is a village in Viborg Municipality, Denmark.

Mønsted Kalkgruber, the largest limestone mine in the world, is located just northwest of the village.

References

Villages in Denmark
Cities and towns in the Central Denmark Region
Viborg Municipality